The John Scott Horner House is located in Ripon, Wisconsin.

History
John Scott Horner was Governor of the Michigan Territory before becoming Secretary of the Wisconsin Territory. He would help to established Ripon, along with Ripon College. The house was listed on the National Register of Historic Places in 1984 and on the State Register of Historic Places in 1989.

References

Houses on the National Register of Historic Places in Wisconsin
National Register of Historic Places in Fond du Lac County, Wisconsin
Houses in Fond du Lac County, Wisconsin
Italianate architecture in Wisconsin
Limestone buildings in the United States
Houses completed in 1860